General elections were held in Belgium on Tuesday 14 June 1892, the first full general elections since 1870 and the last before the introduction of universal male suffrage prior to the 1894 elections. The result was a victory for the Catholic Party, which won 92 of the 152 seats in the Chamber of Representatives and 46 of the 76 seats in the Senate. Only 2.2% of the country's population were eligible to vote.

Run-off elections were held on Tuesday 21 June 1892 in the arrondissements of Mons, Tournai, Verviers, Nivelles and Charleroi as no candidate received a majority there.

Results

Chamber of Representatives

Senate

Constituencies
The distribution of seats among the electoral districts was as follows for the Chamber of Representatives, with the difference compared to the previous election due to population growth:

References

1890s elections in Belgium
General
Belgium
Belgium